Hyposmocoma parda is a species of moth of the family Cosmopterigidae. It was first described by Arthur Gardiner Butler in 1881. It is endemic to the Hawaiian islands of Maui and Hawaii.

The food plant is unknown, but it is thought to feed on dead wood.

External links

parda
Endemic moths of Hawaii
Moths described in 1881